Jushin (also Romanized as Jūshīn, Jooshin, and Jowshīn; also known as Dzheshun, Joshīn, Joshun, and Jowshūn) is a village in Jushin Rural District, Kharvana District, Varzaqan County, East Azerbaijan Province, Iran. At the 2006 census, its population was 499, in 122 families.

References 

Towns and villages in Varzaqan County